Ragghianti is a surname. Notable people with the surname include:

Carlo Ludovico Ragghianti (1910–1987), Italian art critic, historian, philosopher of art and politician
Marie Ragghianti (born 1942), American parole board administrator
Matt Ragghianti, American television writer

Italian-language surnames